Graham Anthony Ricketts (30 July 1939 – 2000) is a former footballer who played as a wing half for Bristol Rovers, Stockport County, Doncaster Rovers, and Peterborough United. He was also an England Youth international.

Club career
Ricketts began his career at Bristol Rovers, moving to Stockport County in 1961.

Doncaster Rovers
He was signed in July 1964 by English fourth division club Doncaster Rovers, his debut being in a 5–2 defeat at Bradford Park Avenue on 22 August 1954.

Peterborough United
He was sold for £2,500 to Peterborough United of the English third division in March 1968. His first game was against Stockport County on 9 March 1968, and his first goal was in a 1–1 draw at Shrewsbury Town a week later.

At the end of the 1969–70 season, Ricketts left to play for King's Lynn, and later played for March Town United and Yaxley.

International career
Ricketts was an England youth international, playing in 4 matches in February and March 1956.

Personal life
His grandson, Joe Burgess, played as a defender for Peterborough United, Histon, Fleetwood Town, Ilkeston, and Boston United.

References

1939 births
Living people
Footballers from Oxford
English footballers
English Football League players
Association football wing halves
Bristol Rovers F.C. players
Stockport County F.C. players
Doncaster Rovers F.C. players
Peterborough United F.C. players
King's Lynn F.C. players
March Town United F.C. players
Yaxley F.C. players
England youth international footballers